The painting series Forty Scenes of the Yuanmingyuan depicts historically recognized vistas in the Old Summer Palace in Beijing, China. In 1744, the Qianlong Emperor commissioned a set of forty paintings from two court artists, Shen Yuan and Tangdai, and a calligrapher, Wang Youdun. The paintings, currently in the collection of Bibliothèque nationale de France, are among the few remaining visual records of the Yuanmingyuan prior to the sack by French and British troops in 1860. Twenty-four out of the forty garden scenes depicted in paintings were lost in the destruction of 1860, the remaining scenes have been lost over time since then.

Gallery

References

Footnotes

Sources
 For 40 scenes in reduced size reproduction, and Chinese language comments about the original park activities, see 

Old Summer Palace
Chinese paintings
1744 paintings